Bandar Dato' Onn is a suburb in Johor Bahru, Johor, Malaysia.

Name
The suburb is named after the late Dato' Onn bin Jaafar.

History
Bandar Dato' Onn was developed by Johor Land Berhad. It was officially launched by Education Minister Datuk Seri Hishammudin Tun Hussein, the grandson of Dato' Onn.

Architecture
When fully completed, the suburb will house 90,000 residents spread across 19 neighborhoods.

Transportation
Dato' Onn Interchange was officially launched by Johor Crown Prince Tunku Ismail Idris.

References

External links

Johor Land Berhad
Komuniti Perjiranan 10, Bandar Dato' Onn
Komuniti Perjiranan 11, Bandar Dato' Onn
Persatuan Penduduk Bandar Dato' Onn, Perjiranan 10

Towns and suburbs in Johor Bahru District
Populated places in Johor